People's Poet of Uzbekistan is an order of the Republic of Uzbekistan.

1963 
 Gʻafur Gʻulom—poet, author, publisher, and translator.

1965 
 Zulfiya Isroilova—poet, translator, and public figure.

1981 
 Shukrullo Yusupov—poet and playwright.

1992 
 Halima Xudoyberdiyeva—poet and editor.
 Oydin Hojieva—poet.

1998 
 Anvar Obidjon—poet.

1999 
 Xurshid Davron—poet, journalist, historian, author, and translator.

2000 
 Usmon Azim—poet, playwright, screenplay writer, and writer of prose.

References

Poetry awards
Orders, decorations, and medals of Uzbekistan
+